Görög; is a surname of Hungarian origins which means Greek. Notable people with the surname include:

Ibolya Görög (born 1947), Hungarian etiquette coach & expert, honorary associate professor (docent, reader), former chief of protocol of Hungary at the Prime Minister's Office
László Görög (disambiguation), several people
Zita Görög (born 1979), Hungarian actress and model

Hungarian-language surnames
Ethnonymic surnames